David Blu (born David Bluthenthal; July 18, 1980) is an American–Israeli former professional basketball player, who spent 10 seasons playing in the EuroLeague. He is considered to be one of the top three-point shooters in EuroLeague history. He was also the 2011 Israeli Basketball Premier League Finals MVP. He also represented the senior Israeli national team in 2010.

Early life
Blu was born in Los Angeles, California, and is Jewish.  His mother was Jewish, and his African American father converted to Judaism. He represented the United States at the 1997 Maccabiah Games, winning a gold medal.

Blu attended Palms Middle School, and Venice High School and Westchester High School.

College career
Blu attended the University of Southern California (USC), which was founded by his great-great-granduncle, Isaias Hellman. A starter from his sophomore season on, he was consistently one of the top players in the Pac-10.

In 2001–02, his senior season, Blu was named All-Pac 10 honorable mention.  He averaged 12.1 points, 7.5 rebounds, and 1.2 assists per game.   He left school in 2002, to pursue a career in professional basketball.
His most memorable performance remains the 27 points he scored against Kentucky, in an NCAA regional semifinal upset in 2001, made by the USC Trojans team that was led by Blu.

Professional career

Maccabi Tel Aviv
After Blu completed his 4 years of college athletics eligibility, he decided to play professional basketball in Europe, and signed with Israeli professional team Maccabi Tel Aviv, of the EuroLeague. During two years with Maccabi Tel Aviv (2002–04), he helped the team to the EuroLeague championship in 2004, and to the Israeli National Cup title twice. He scored 20 points off the bench, in the 2004 EuroLeague Final, a 44-point Maccabi annihilation of one of the best team in Europe, Fortitudo Bologna.

Following the 2004 season, Blu was signed by the NBA's Sacramento Kings, on August 7, 2004, but he was released in November, before the 2004–05 season started.

Dynamo St. Petersburg
Following his release from Sacramento, Blu received an offer from the Russian team BC Dynamo Saint Petersburg, that had just signed David Blatt, who was the head coach of Maccabi Tel Aviv, during the time that Blu was there.  In 8 games played in the Russian Basketball Super League A, he shot 69.6% from 2-point range.

Italian teams
After two months in Russia, Blu went to Italy, to play for Benetton Treviso. He shot over 60% from 2-point range, and over 51% from 3-point range, in the Italian League.

In the summer of 2005, he signed with Virtus Bologna, and became one of their top players, with a scoring average of 20.2 points per game in the Italian League.

After the 2005–06 season, he signed with Virtus' intense crosstown rivals, Fortitudo. During the 2006–07 season, for Fortitudo, he averaged 16 points and 4.2 rebounds in EuroLeague play, and also made 46.8% of his two-point shots, and 53.3% of his three-pointers.

Second stint with Maccabi
On June 15, 2007, Blu returned from Fortitudo, to Maccabi Tel Aviv. He averaged 8.7 points and 2.4 rebounds in 25 EuroLeague games for Maccabi, as they advanced to the EuroLeague Finals, against winners CSKA Moscow.

Le Mans
On July 10, 2008, Blu signed a one-year deal with Le Mans. Over 10 games in the EuroLeague, he averaged 12.5 points and 3.8 rebounds per game.

Third stint with Maccabi

In the summer of 2009, Blu yet again returned to Israel, and signed a one-year contract with Maccabi Tel Aviv. He finished the 2010–11 season with averages of 8.9 points and 3.1 rebounds per game in the EuroLeague, and 10.9 points and 3.9 rebounds per game in the Israeli Super League. He named the 2011 Israeli Basketball Premier League Finals MVP. In July 2011, Maccabi extended Blu's contract for another year.

In June 2012, Blu retired for the first time, in order to complete his college education in the USA.

After graduating college in the summer of 2013, Blu signed a new contract with Maccabi Tel Aviv. Following his comeback, after an up and down season, Maccabi won the 2014 EuroLeague championship, the sixth in the club's history, and his second. Over the season, he averaged 10.1 points and 3.2 rebounds per game, over 30 games played in the EuroLeague. In the EuroLeague Final Four, he helped his team oust CSKA Moscow in the semifinals, by scoring 15 points, with some crucial three-pointers. In the championship finals game, against Real Madrid, he scored 14 points and grabbed 4 rebounds. Once the season ended, Blu announced his retirement from playing professional basketball.

National team career
In the summer of 2010, Blu represented Israel, and he made his first appearance with them against Portugal, on July 19, 2010. Blu also competed with the senior Israeli national team at the EuroBasket 2011, where he averaged 12.8 points per game and 3.2 rebounds per game.

Accolades
In 2006 he was inducted into the Southern California Jewish Sports Hall of Fame.

Career statistics

EuroLeague

|-
| style="text-align:left;"| 2002–03
| style="text-align:left;" rowspan=2| Maccabi
| 14 || 0 || 11.1 || .522 || .368 || .700 || 1.8 || .4 || .3 || .0 || 4.4 || 4.3
|-
| style="text-align:left;background:#AFE6BA;"| 2003–04†
| 17 || 0 || 10.2 || .609 || .462 || .789 || 1.4 || .4 || .2 || .1 || 6.2 || 4.5
|-
| style="text-align:left;"| 2004–05
| style="text-align:left;"| Benetton
| 10 || 0 || 18.1 || .393 || .276 || .500 || 2.5 || .9 || .8 || .3 || 5.8 || 4.7
|-
| style="text-align:left;"| 2006–07
| style="text-align:left;"| Climamio
| 14 || 10 || 31.7 || .491 || style="background:#CFECEC;"|.533 || .828 || 4.2 || 1.2 || .6 || .1 || 16.0 || 13.4
|-
| style="text-align:left;"| 2007–08
| style="text-align:left;"| Maccabi
| 25 || 18 || 21.0 || .488 || .456 || .929 || 2.4 || .6 || .3 || .1 || 8.7 || 6.6
|-
| style="text-align:left;"| 2008–09
| style="text-align:left;"| Le Mans 
| 10 || 8 || 32.9 || .413 || .360 || .913 || 3.8 || 1.1 || 1.2 || .0 || 12.5 || 11.2
|-
| style="text-align:left;"| 2009–10
| style="text-align:left;" rowspan=4| Maccabi
| 19 || 1 || 23.6 || .409 || .363 || .880 || 3.0 || 1.1 || .5 || .1 || 9.3 || 7.2
|-
| style="text-align:left;"| 2010–11
| 22 || 1 || 23.0 || .448 || .432 || .727 || 3.1 || .6 || .8 || .1 || 8.9 || 6.6
|-
| style="text-align:left;"| 2011–12
| 20 || 6 || 24.6 || .447 || .375 || .880 || 2.5 || .5 || .6 || .0 || 9.3 || 6.4
|-
| style="text-align:left;background:#AFE6BA;"| 2013–14†
| 30 || 6 || 24.8 || .433 || .406 || .816 || 3.2 || 1.0 || .6 || .0 || 10.1 || 8.2
|- class="sortbottom"
| style="text-align:left;"| Career
| style="text-align:left;"|
| 181 || 50 || 22.1 || .457 || .411 || .833 || 2.8 || .8 || .5 || .1 || 9.1 || 7.2

See also
 List of select Jewish basketball players

References

External links

 David Blu at draftexpress.com
 David Blu at eurobasket.com
 David Blu at euroleague.net
 David Blu at nba.com
 

1980 births
Living people
ABA League players
African-American basketball players
African-American Jews
American expatriate basketball people in France
American expatriate basketball people in Italy
American expatriate basketball people in Russia
American men's basketball players
Maccabiah Games medalists in basketball
Basketball players from Los Angeles
BC Dynamo Saint Petersburg players
Fortitudo Pallacanestro Bologna players
Israeli Basketball Premier League players
Israeli American
Israeli Jews
Israeli men's basketball players
Jewish men's basketball players
Le Mans Sarthe Basket players
Maccabiah Games basketball players of the United States
Maccabiah Games gold medalists for the United States
Competitors at the 1997 Maccabiah Games
Maccabi Tel Aviv B.C. players
Pallacanestro Treviso players
Power forwards (basketball)
Small forwards
USC Trojans men's basketball players
Virtus Bologna players
Westchester High School (Los Angeles) alumni
Venice High School (Los Angeles) alumni
21st-century African-American sportspeople
21st-century American Jews
20th-century African-American people